A statue of Inoue Masaru is installed in Marunouchi Central Plaza, outside Tokyo Station, in Tokyo, Japan.

External links
 

Marunouchi
Monuments and memorials in Japan
Outdoor sculptures in Tokyo
Sculptures of men in Japan
Statues in Japan